The 1914 French Grand Prix was a Grand Prix motor race held at Lyon on 4 July 1914. Hailed as one of the greatest races of the twentieth century, it was a contest between the French Peugeots and the German Mercedes. For the first time, the Grand Prix was run to an engine limitation – of 4.5L maximum capacity. It was won by the Mercedes of Christian Lautenschlager who won at an average speed of  after a tense seven-hour contest with the Peugeot of Georges Boillot.

Regulations and Circuit
For several years, the Automobile Club de France (ACF) had been trying to reduce engine sizes in racing which it saw as increasingly dangerous with their higher speeds. This obviously benefited the leading French racing manufacturers of Peugeot and Delage, that had dominated the recent years of voiturette racing along with Sunbeam, at the expense of the big-engined cars of Italy and Germany. There was also an entry limit of five cars per manufacturer, and no privateer entries were permitted.

The city of Lyon promised large subsidies to host and the race was held on a 37.6 km road circuit to the south of the city. It ran from Les Ronzières to the town of Givors. It then took the Route Nationale 88 winding along beside the Gier (a tributary of the Rhône) to Châteauneuf. It returned on a long, undulating  straight before coming to a steep downhill right-left switchback (nicknamed le piege de la mort – the Death trap) and a hairpin at Les Sept Chemins to complete the lap. At the end of June the two hairpin turns were concreted and the course was re-laid with granite chips to prevent its break-up and coated with calcium chloride to reduce the dust raised. The Grand Prix was to be twenty laps of the circuit, totalling 752.6 km.

Entries
On 28 June, the Archduke Franz Ferdinand, heir to the Austro-Hungarian empire was assassinated in Sarajevo. A week later, the French Grand Prix was held under an increasingly tense political situation across Europe.

The race attracted one of the highest-quality fields hitherto assembled, of 37 starters from 13 manufacturers and 6 countries. Peugeot were the strong favourites to repeat their victories in 1912 and 1913. They arrived with the new EX-5 (or ‘L-45’, after its engine size) for team drivers Georges Boillot, Jules Goux and Victor Rigal. The 4.5-litre four-cylinder engine had a twin-overhead cam and generated 112 bhp. Now fitted with four-wheel brakes it also sported a streamlined extended tail. Boillot had tested it at Brooklands and found it lifted the top speed by 8%. The tail also accommodated two spare tyres.

Louis Delâge bought the new 5-speed Type S for Albert Guyot, Arthur Duray and Paul Bablot. Like the Peugeots and FIATs, it was sporting four-wheel brakes.
New French company Alva convinced Ferenc Szisz, winner of the inaugural Grand Prix in 1906, out of retirement to lead their team.

The most serious opposition to the French teams would come from Mercedes, returning to the Grand Prix for the first time since winning in 1908. The company had not made a racing engine before that revved over 1500rpm so Paul Daimler engaged the aero-engine division to assist with engine development. The new 4.5-litre unit had innovative single-cast cylinders with four valves each and a single overhead camshaft, giving 106 bhp at 3100rpm. Gone was the chain-drive, instead a lighter live rear-axle was used. However, they did persist with rear brakes only.
Five of the six 18/100 cars built were entered, with a strong team of drivers led by Christian Lautenschlager, victor in 1908. Alongside him were Otto Salzer, young Mercedes director Max Sailer, French veteran Louis Wagner and Belgian Mercedes-agent Théodore Pilette.

The new Opel was a development of the 4.0-litre 1913 model, retaining its single-overhead camshaft, with four valves per cylinder and a live rear axle like the Mercedes. They were the lightest cars in the field, well over 100 kg lighter than most others. Regular works driver Carl Jörns led a team of three cars.

From Italy came FIAT (including veteran Alessandro Cagno), Felice Nazzaro's own team Automobili Nazzaro, and a single entry from Aquila Italiana. Great Britain was represented by Sunbeam (Resta, Lee Guinness and Chassagne) and Vauxhall who included American Ralph DePalma in their squad.

Practice

Mercedes knew that meticulous preparation would be needed if they were to beat the French cars. In January, the company had sent its team to France to reconnoitre the track to calculate gearing ratios. Two cars were ready in April for testing where two changes were noted. The extended tail was cut off to save weight and, from the long straights and winding corners, the engineers recommended changing to a five-speed gearbox. However, there was no time to arrange the latter.

The ACF organised a practice period on the new circuit three weeks before the event. However, because they were public roads all that could be arranged were a couple of 90-minute pre-dawn sessions, which left most teams disgruntled. The Vauxhall cars were not even ready by then.

The Peugeot team was confident that their 4-wheel brakes would allow better cornering and the higher top-end speed from the Peugeot's streamlined rear-end would be decisive. In contrast,  the Mercedes’ lower centre-of-gravity would provide better road-holding to give it an edge over the French cars. They were also running on more durable Continental tyres. While the French cars were on Dunlops. Thus, the Mercedes team calculated they would only need to make a single tyre-stop for each car during the race.

During practice though the Peugeot drivers found their cars handled badly, with the poor weight distribution having the spare tyres stowed in the tail.
The only disruption for Mercedes was when Pilette missed a gear-change and over-revved his engine badly.

The Race
Race-day was hot and fine, and about 300,000 spectators lined the roads. So many were coming out on the trains from the city that many missed the 8am start. For the first time, cars were flagged off in pairs at 30-second intervals, in numerical order. First away were Szisz and Jörns, but Boillot was the first to arrive back at the finish-line. However, Sailer was ahead on elapsed-time with an 18-second lead and from the beginning he forced the pace, drawing Boillot into a speed-contest. Jörns had to stop on the first lap for radiator repairs, dropping his Opel out of the reckoning.

When Boillot had to pit unexpectedly after an hour, on the third lap, it allowed Sailer to take the lead on the road. Pilette's Mercedes retired at the same time, the gearbox damage in practice proving terminal. Sailer pressed on setting the fastest lap of the race on lap four and extending his lead over Boillot to almost three minutes. Whether it was racing inexperience, or internal rivalry with team-leader Lautenschlager to prove a point, Sailer had pushed his car too hard and stopped with a broken conrod along the Gier River on the sixth lap.  (Sailer and no one else at Mercedes had said there was a deliberate plan to use a “hare” to break the Peugeots.)

After seven laps Boillot had the lead over Lautenschlager, while Goux had just overtaken Duray's Delage to move into third. On the tenth lap at the halfway point, Wagner, Salzer, and Resta's Sunbeam, had also overtaken the Delage. Boillot led by a minute and the German team started coming in for their scheduled stops. Lautenschlager was running out of brakes and his stop became a bit of a shambles as the normally well-drilled Mercedes team cost him 2–3 minutes in the pits. But the Peugeot Dunlops were wearing far quicker – Boillot had to make six pitstops for tyre changes to the single ones for the Mercedes cars.

But despite that, Boillot's skill and all-or-nothing driving kept him with a 2-3 minute lead. By the 11th lap with the pitstops done, Wagner had passed Goux and Lautenschlager to move into second. Then a dangerous accident happened. Szisz had pulled over on the roadside to change a wheel, when he was struck by Breckheimer's Opel when it was obscured by the dust. His arm broken, it fell to his less injured mechanic to slowly get the car back to the pits where Szisz could get attention.

The Peugeots’ stops lost their advantage and the Mercedes’ pursuit was relentless. Although Wagner had to pit on lap 15 to replace tyres, Salzer overtook Goux to move up to fourth. When Boillot then had to pit for tyres on the 17th lap Lautenschlager reduced the lead from 2 minutes to just 14 seconds. He overtook the Peugeot as they approached Givors. Boillot's car had been thrashed to its limits and was now falling apart, down to three cylinders. By the end of the 18th lap he was 30 seconds behind. Boillot kept pushing regardless but on the last lap his engine finally expired when he over-revved it on the climb out of the Gier valley. Boillot was distraught, hunched over the steering wheel weeping at his failure.

So after seven hours of racing, Mercedes took a crushing 1-2-3 victory with Lautenschlager repeating his 1908 win ahead of Wagner and Salzer. The French crowd was silent, with Goux's fourth place nearly ten minutes back ahead of Resta's Sunbeam being scant consolation.

Post-race
And so it was that perhaps the greatest race of the early period of motor-racing was also the last. Within a month, Europe had descended into total war and racing ceased there for four years.

With his 25000 franc prizemoney, Lautenschlager retired from racing and was able to build himself a house. Georges Boillot was initially the personal driver for Marshal Joffre, but then transferred to the French Air Force (Armée de l'Air) as a fighter pilot. He was shot down over Verdun in April 1916 in a dogfight and died in the wreckage.

Fagnano had throttled back on his FIAT and finished 11th and last, well over an hour after the winner. It was postulated that, as the sole finisher for FIAT, it had been a prudent move by the team. This was in light of the fact that the scrutineers had found the total engine cylinder-volume was over the 4500cc limit. This would disqualify the team but FIAT's strong support of the race in the past allowed them to race.

After being driven back to celebrations in Berlin, one of the Mercedes (probably Lautenschlager's) was sent on display in London with two of the Opels. War broke out just afterward, and it was commandeered and turned over to Rolls-Royce where it was carefully pulled apart. The engine was developed and a version ended up in the Bristol fighter planes. American driver Ralph DePalma bought Wagner's car at the race conclusion and took it back to the USA (there is still considerable conjecture and confusion as to which Mercedes chassis ended up in London and the USA). Carl Fisher, on the Indianapolis 500 organising committee, purchased two of the Peugeot EX-5s. When they landed in the United States he handed them over to the Premier Motor Corporation for three replicas to be made.

In the 1915 Indianapolis 500, DePalma drove the Mercedes to beat Dario Resta, in a Peugeot EX-5, by three and a half minutes. Resta got his revenge the year after with a victory and a Peugeot won again in the 1919 race.

Classification

References
Citations

Bibliography
 Cimarosti, Adriano (1997)    The Complete History of Grand Prix Motor Racing    London: Aurum Press Ltd  
 Fox, Charles (1973)    The Great Racing Cars & Drivers    London: Octopus Books Ltd  
 Georgano, Nick (1971)    The Encyclopaedia of Motor Sport    London: Ebury Press Ltd  
 Higham, Peter (1995)    The Guinness Guide to International Motor Racing    London: Guinness Publishing  
 Legate, Trevor (2006)    100 years of Grand Prix    Kent: Touchstone Books Ltd  
 Ludvigsen, Karl (2008)    Racing Colours - Italian Racing Red    Surrey: Ian Allan Publishing Ltd  
 Ludvigsen, Karl (2009)    Racing Colours - German Racing Silver    Surrey: Ian Allan Publishing Ltd  
 Monkhouse, George (1953)    Grand Prix Racing Facts and Figures   London: G.T. Foulis & Co Ltd
 Rendall, Ivan (1991)    The Power and The Glory – A Century of Motor Racing    London: BBC Books  
 Rendall, Ivan (1993)    The Chequered Flag – 100 years of Motor Racing    London: Weidenfeld & Nicolson Ltd  
 Venables, David (2009)    Racing Colours - French Racing Blue    Surrey: Ian Allan Publishing Ltd

External links
  Grand Prix Winners 1895–1949 : Part 1 (1895–1916)   – list of the races and winners. Retrieved 28 Aug 2019
  Grand Prix Winners 1895–1949 : History  – Hans Etzrodt's description of the annual regulations, and changes. Retrieved 7 Jun 2019
  GEL Motorsport Information Page  - Darren Galpan's list of the races, entrants and results. Retrieved 6 Sep 2019
  6th Gear History  - Leif Snellman's article of the race “Remember it for the one who lost”. Retrieved 16 Sep 2019

French Grand Prix
French Grand Prix
Grand Prix